Carlson Gracie (August 13, 1932 – February 1, 2006) was a practitioner of Brazilian jiu-jitsu.  A member of the Gracie family, he was the eldest son of Carlos Gracie, and nephew to Hélio Gracie, founders of Gracie jiu-jitsu.

Carlson Gracie is considered one of the most important and influential Brazilian jiu-jitsu practitioners. He and his students created various innovative techniques and strategies which revolutionized Jiu-Jitsu. He is also a mixed martial arts pioneer, having participated in multiple vale tudo matches in the 1950s and 1960s. His academy had one of the first programs for specific training for MMA, and many of his students would become world champions and go on to establish their own academies.

Career 
Carlson was an early pioneer in mixed martial arts, founding one of the most successful teams of the era, which spawned many champions. In 2000, following a financial dispute, many of Carlson Gracie's students would split from him to form another MMA team, the Brazilian Top Team. These students were called creontes by Carlson Gracie because of perceived lack of loyalty.

Carlson fought a total of eighteen vale tudo fights, with only one loss to Luta Livre fighter Euclides Pereira in a fight that was held in Bahia. His first fight was on March 17, 1953 against capoeira practitioner Luiz "Cirandinha" Aguiar, apprentice of Mestre Sinhozinho. Carlson won by submission due to mounted strikes after a tough fight. His second match was a draw against another capoeirista, Wilson "Passarito" Oliveira, in May 1953. Carlson had a rematch with Passarito in March 1954 in the longest fight of his career, which he won in the fifth 30 minute round. Most notable are his four matches with Valdemar Santana, who had defeated his uncle Hélio Gracie in a fabled match in May 1955. He beat Santana in the first fight avenging his family. In October 1955 Carlson fought Santana to a draw in a jiu-jitsu match. In 1956 and 1957 Carlson won two fights and in 1959 they fought to a draw.

Carlson Gracie trained many top competitors, including, among many others, Ricardo De La Riva, Allan Goes, Murilo Bustamante, Mário Sperry, Wallid Ismail, Pablo Popovitch, Vauvenargues "Marinho" Vicentini, André Pederneiras, and Ricardo Liborio. He was also responsible for introducing  Vitor Belfort to Gracie jiu-jitsu. 

Carlson Gracie  trained Stephan Bonnar, a finalist in the UFC reality show The Ultimate Fighter 1. He was in Bonnar's corner during his fight against eventual The Ultimate Fighter winner Forrest Griffin. He is the author of a book on the subject of Jiu Jitsu titled Brazilian jiu-jitsu: For Experts Only, which includes his student Julio "Foca" Fernandez.

The oldest son of Carlos Gracie, who founded Gracie jiu-jitsu in Rio de Janeiro during the 1920s, Carlson reigned as world champion for thirty years covering the '50s, '60s and '70s.

Carlson catapulted to fame at the age of 23 when he avenged the defeat of his uncle Helio Gracie. A former student of Helio's, Waldemar Santana, had defeated the much older Helio during a match in 1955. That match lasted four hours. Carlson's rematch with Santana in 1956 was a much shorter affair: four rounds of vicious vale-tudo combat came to draw.

Carlson's influence on no-holds-barred fighting and mixed martial arts is extensive as well, for the style of jiu-jitsu he taught at his academy was distinct from that being taught by Helio. While Helio's brand of jiu-jitsu emphasized defensive techniques aiming to allow the smaller and weaker to defeat the stronger opponent, Carlson and his brothers Carley Gracie and Rolls Gracie favored a much more active, 'warrior style' of jiu-jitsu that encouraged physical prowess and barraging your opponent with a series of attacks. 

Some of Carlson's lineage can be seen in the creation of some of the greatest MMA gyms in the world: Brazilian Top Team, Nova União,  American Top Team and Black House were all founded by Carlson Gracie's black belts.

Death
Carlson Gracie died on February 1, 2006, in Chicago, Illinois, of heart failure, apparently the result of complications of kidney stones (and possibly his pre-existing diabetes), following a hospitalization of several days. At the time of his death he was a ninth degree red belt and was referred to as Grandmaster.

A bronze statue was installed next to his gym in Rio de Janeiro on August 12, 2019.

Instructor lineage 
Kano Jigoro → Tomita Tsunejiro → Mitsuyo "Count Koma" Maeda → Carlos Gracie Sr. → Carlson Gracie.

Personal life 
Carlson had three children and two grandchildren.
Gracie was  a close friend of  Wing Chun Grandmaster Samuel Kwok, and  the two often toured and held seminars together.

See also
Creonte - a term said to have been coined by Carlson
List of Brazilian jiu-jitsu practitioners

References

External links 
 Carlson Gracie BJJ Heroes Profile
 Carlson Gracie Federation
 Carlson Gracie Chicago
 Carlson Gracie Placentia 

1932 births
2006 deaths
Sportspeople from Rio de Janeiro (city)
Mixed martial arts trainers
Brazilian jiu-jitsu trainers
Carlson
Martial arts school founders
Brazilian male mixed martial artists
Mixed martial artists utilizing judo
Brazilian male judoka
People awarded a red belt in Brazilian jiu-jitsu
20th-century philanthropists
IBJJF Hall of Fame inductees